The Devil's Anvil was a 1960s hard rock band based in New York City.  They released one album, entitled Hard Rock from the Middle East, in 1967, showcasing a mix of 1960s hard-rock sound with Arab, Greek and  Turkish songs and melodies.

Formation 
Instrumental in the band's formation was producer Felix Pappalardi, who helped sign them with Columbia Records.

Recordings 
Unfortunately for The Devil's Anvil, their one and only album, Hard Rock from the Middle East, was released during escalating tensions between Israel and neighboring Arab countries and the subsequent Arab–Israeli War in 1967.

Hard Rock from the Middle East 

All tracks arranged by the band unless otherwise indicated.

 "Wala Dai" (Traditional*)
 "Nahna Ou Diab"
 "Karkadon" (Lebanese; composed by Abdul-Galil Wabbi, lyrics by Philimon Webbi)
 "Selim Alai" (Traditional Arab*)
 "Isme (El Atrash)"
 "Besaha" (Lebanese; composed by Afif Radwan, lyrics by Abdul-Galil Wabbi)
 "Shisheler" (Traditional Turkish)
 "Kley" (Greek; composed by Theodorakis, lyrics by Leivaditis)
 "Hala Laya" (Traditional Arab*)
 "Treea Pethya" (Traditional Greek)
 "Misirlou" (Traditional Middle Eastern; composed by Leeds, Roubanis, Russell, Wise)

*Arranged by Pappalardi

References

Musical groups from New York City
Psychedelic rock music groups from New York (state)